Marius Robert Suller (born 5 September 1978) is a Romanian football coach and former player.

Honours
Universitatea Cluj
Liga II: 2006–07

External links

1978 births
Living people
Sportspeople from Cluj-Napoca
Romanian footballers
FC Universitatea Cluj players
Association football defenders
Romanian football managers
FC Unirea Dej players